Sonagiri is a suburb in Bhopal, India, in the BHEL township in the city of Bhopal.

Etymology
In Hindi, Sonagiri means a hill of gold.

Establishments 
Sonagiri, along with the adjacent suburb, Indrapuri is located by the Raisen Road. Sonagiri is now a bustling commercial area, with numerous stores, hospitals & other establishments. Sonagiri is divided into multiple sectors, each of which have a mix of residential & commercial spaces. Sonagiri also has its own Municipal Corporation office.

Apart from this, Sonagiri is adjacent to multiple residential colonies like Kalpana Nagar, Laxmi Nagar and Mohan Nagar.

Neighbourhoods in Bhopal